The St. Paul and Duluth Railroad was reorganized from the Lake Superior and Mississippi Railroad in 1877.  It was bought by the Northern Pacific in 1900.  Known as the "Skally Line", it operated from Saint Paul to Duluth, Minnesota, with branches to Minneapolis, Taylors Falls, Kettle River, and Cloquet, in Minnesota, and Grantsburg and Superior in Wisconsin.

Disposition
The line was purchased by the Northern Pacific Railway, which was succeeded by the Burlington Northern and then the Burlington Northern Santa Fe.  Most of the line became redundant with other lines after the Burlington Northern merger, as it paralleled another line of the Great Northern Railway.  Most of the line therefore was abandoned and many segments were turned into rail trails.

The disposition of those segments is as follows:
 St. Paul, Minnesota to Maplewood, Minnesota - abandoned; now part of the Bruce Vento Regional Trail
 Maplewood, Minnesota to Hugo, Minnesota - now operated by the Minnesota Commercial Railway
 Hugo, Minnesota to North Branch, Minnesota - abandoned; now the Hardwood Creek Regional Trail and Sunrise Prairie Trail
 North Branch, Minnesota to Hinckley, Minnesota - now operated by the St. Croix Valley Railroad
 Hinckley, Minnesota to Duluth, Minnesota - abandoned; now the Willard Munger State Trail

Defunct Minnesota railroads
Predecessors of the Northern Pacific Railway
Railway companies established in 1877
Railway companies disestablished in 1900
Defunct Wisconsin railroads
American companies disestablished in 1900
1877 establishments in Minnesota